The Billy Moore Unit a.k.a. the Billy Moore Correctional Center is a private state prison for men located in Overton, Rusk County, Texas, operated (since October 2008) by Management and Training Corporation under contract with the Texas Department of Criminal Justice.

The facility holds a maximum of 513 inmates at medium and minimum security levels.  Prior to October 2008 the prison was operated by Corrections Corporation of America.

References

Prisons in Texas
Buildings and structures in Rusk County, Texas
Management and Training Corporation
1995 establishments in Texas